Samuel Michener (born May 24, 1987) is an American bobsledder. He competed in the four-man event at the 2018 Winter Olympics.

References

External links
 

1987 births
Living people
American male bobsledders
Olympic bobsledders of the United States
Bobsledders at the 2018 Winter Olympics
Place of birth missing (living people)